= Gaston Poupinel =

French surgeon

Gaston Poupinel (1858-1930) was a French surgeon. A student of Louis Pasteur, in 1885 he introduced in France the first device of dry heat sterilization which started being used in many hospitals.
